Greatest Hits is a compilation album released by country singer Jo Dee Messina in 2003.

This album featured Messina's biggest hits from her first three studio albums (1996's Jo Dee Messina, 1998's I'm Alright, and 2000's Burn). Also included are four new studio tracks: "Was That My Life", "Wishing Well", "You Belong in the Sun", and "I Wish". Of these, "Was That My Life" and "I Wish" were released as singles, peaking at #21 and #15, respectively, on the Billboard country music charts in 2003. "Wishing Well" was previously recorded by country singer Jessica Andrews on her 2001 album Who I Am. The album itself was certified gold by the RIAA.

An alternate release of the album features a bonus multimedia track of "Bring On the Rain".

Track listing

Charts

Weekly charts

Year-end charts

References

2003 greatest hits albums
Jo Dee Messina albums
Curb Records compilation albums